Tract may refer to:

Geography and real estate
 Housing tract, an area of land that is subdivided into smaller individual lots
 Land lot or tract, a section of land
 Census tract, a geographic region defined for the purpose of taking a census

Writings
 Tract (literature), a short written work, usually of a political or religious nature
 Tract (liturgy), a component of Roman Catholic liturgy
 Treatise

Biology
 Nerve tract, a bundle of fibers that connects different parts of the central nervous system - analogous to a nerve in the peripheral nervous system
 A genetic tract, a sequence of repeating nucleotides or amino acids, such as a polyglutamine tract
 A collection of related anatomic structures, such as:
 Gastrointestinal tract
 Genitourinary tract
 Reproductive tract
 A grouping of feathers, e.g. primaries, auricular, scapular

Businesses
 Tract (imprint), an imprint of the German group VDM Publishing devoted to the reproduction of Wikipedia content

See also

Track (disambiguation)